Fatos Asllan Beja (born 29 November 1948 in Vlorë) is a member of the Assembly of the Republic of Albania for the Democratic Party of Albania. Beja is from 2009 the Chairman of the Committee on Foreign Policy of Albania.

References

Living people
Democratic Party of Albania politicians
1948 births
Members of the Parliament of Albania
People from Vlorë
21st-century Albanian politicians